XXII World Rhythmic Gymnastics Championships were held in Seville, Spain, May 6–10, 1998. This edition had only group events.

Medal winners

Groups All-Around

Groups 5 Balls

Groups 3 Ribbons + 2 Hoops

Medal table

References

Rhythmic Gymnastics World Championships
Rhythmic Gymnastics Championships
Gym
1998 in gymnastics